Andrew Conley (18 December 1881 – 5 June 1952) was a British trade unionist.

Born in Leeds to Irish parents, Conley fought in the Second Boer War. He then worked as a garment maker, and became a branch secretary in the Amalgamated Union of Clothiers Operatives, then national organiser of its successor, the United Garment Workers' Trade Union.

In 1920, various tailors' trade unions merged to form the National Union of Tailors and Garment Workers (NUTGW).  Although Joseph Young was seen as the obvious choice for its leadership, his health was failing, and he instead supported Conley's successful campaign for the general secretaryship. In post, he focussed on absorbing other unions, arranging mergers with more than 20 before he retired in 1948.  He was elected to the General Council of the Trades Union Congress in 1921, and was its President in 1934, where he led centenary commemorations of the Tolpuddle Martyrs.

Conley also supported women's trade unionism, encouraging women tailors to become active in the NUTGW, and he was succeeded as general secretary by Anne Loughlin.

References

1881 births
1952 deaths
British military personnel of the Second Boer War
General Secretaries of the National Union of Tailors and Garment Workers
Members of the General Council of the Trades Union Congress
Trade unionists from Leeds
Presidents of the Trades Union Congress